Satelmish-e Mohammadlu (also Romanized as Sātelmīsh-e Moḩammadlū) is a village in, and the capital of, Zarrineh Rud Rural District of Baktash District of Miandoab County, West Azerbaijan province, Iran. At the 2006 National Census, its population was 1,564 in 345 households. The following census in 2011 counted 1,732 people in 481 households. The latest census in 2016 showed a population of 1,853 people in 540 households.

References 

Miandoab County

Populated places in West Azerbaijan Province

Populated places in Miandoab County